The Maya Cablecar, officially the  is a Japanese funicular line in Kobe, Hyōgo, operated by the public company Kōbe City Urban Development. The line opened in 1925, originally as a route to Tōri Tenjō-ji temple on Mount Maya. Now the line is used to see the scenic view of Kobe. Together with Maya Ropeway, the line has an official nickname .

Basic data

Distance: 
System: Single track with two cars
Gauge: 
Stations: 2
Vertical interval: 
Tunnels: 1
Cars: 2, each with 53 passenger capacity
Operational speed:

stations
Maya Cable Eki (摩耶ケーブル駅)
Niji no Eki (虹の駅) (halfway up Mount Maya)

Surroundings 
Hyogo Prefectural Kobe High School (兵庫県立神戸高等学校) 
The tunnel of cherry trees (桜のトンネル)

Buses 
Kobe City Bus
Route 18 (westbound) for Kobe-sannomiya Station (三宮駅) and Rokkōmichi Station (六甲道駅)
Route 102 (eastbound) for Rokkōmichi Station (六甲道駅)
Kobe Minato Kanko Bus
Maya View Line Saka Bus (まやビューライン坂バス) for Nada Station (灘駅)

See also

List of funicular railways
List of railway companies in Japan
List of railway lines in Japan
Maya Ropeway
Rokkō Arima Ropeway
Rokkō Cable Line
Shin-Kōbe Ropeway

References

External links 

 Maya View Line Yume-Sanpo official website 
 Kōbe City Urban Development official website 

Funicular railways in Japan
Rail transport in Hyōgo Prefecture
1067 mm gauge railways in Japan
1925 establishments in Japan